Predrag Jeremić (Serbian Cyrillic: Предраг Јеремић; born 22 November 1987 in Šabac) is a Serbian football midfielder who plays for 07 Vestur in the Faroe Islands. He is a midfielder, but sometimes he plays as right-back.

Honours
Radnik Surdulica
Serbian First League: 2014–15

References

External links
 
 

1987 births
Living people
Sportspeople from Šabac
Serbian footballers
Serbian expatriate footballers
Association football midfielders
FK Sinđelić Niš players
FK Napredak Kruševac players
FK Dinamo Vranje players
FK Banat Zrenjanin players
FK Radnik Surdulica players
FK Sloboda Užice players
FK Mačva Šabac players
07 Vestur players
Serbian First League players
Serbian SuperLiga players
1. deild karla players
Serbian expatriate sportspeople in the Faroe Islands
Expatriate footballers in the Faroe Islands